Thomas Benjamin Cooray (Sinhala language: තෝමස් බෙන්ජමින් කුරේ), O.M.I. (28 December 1901 – 29 October 1988) was a Sri Lankan cardinal of the Roman Catholic Church who served as the Archbishop of Colombo from 1947 to 1976, and was elevated to the cardinalate in 1965 by Pope Paul VI.

His cause of canonization commenced in 2010 and he has been bestowed with the title of Servant of God.

Biography

Early life and priesthood
Thomas Benjamin Cooray was born to a poor but religious family in Negombo, and attended St. Aloysius Seminary in Borella, and St. Joseph's College and University College in Colombo (University of London) before going to Rome, where he studied at the Pontifical University of St. Thomas Aquinas (Angelicum), obtaining a doctorate in philosophy summa cum laude. After entering the Oblates of Mary Immaculate, he was ordained to the priesthood on June 23, 1929. Finishing his Roman studies in 1931, he then did pastoral work in Colombo until 1945, whilst teaching at St. Joseph's College and serving as a university chaplain. He also became rector of the Oblate seminary in Sri Lanka.

Episcopate
On December 14, 1945, Cooray was appointed Coadjutor Archbishop of Colombo and Titular Archbishop of Preslavus by Pope Pius XII. He received his episcopal consecration on March 7, 1946 from Archbishop Leo Kierkels, with Bishops Edmund Peiris, OMI, and Bernardo Regno, OSB, serving as co-consecrators. Cooray succeeded the late Jean-Marie Masson, OMI, as Archbishop of Colombo on July 26, 1947, becoming the first local-born head of the see. During his tenure as Archbishop, he "favored a respectful dialogue with the Buddhists and with other Christians". From 1962 to 1965, he attended the Second Vatican Council, at which he supported the Coetus Internationalis Patrum.

Cardinalate and death
Pope Paul VI created him Cardinal Priest of Santi Nereo e Achilleo in the consistory of February 22, 1965. Cooray, the first Sri Lankan member of the College of Cardinals, resigned as Colombo's archbishop on September 2, 1976, after a period of twenty-nine years. He was one of the cardinal electors who participated in the conclaves of August and October 1978, which selected Popes John Paul I and John Paul II respectively, and the first Sri Lankan to participate in the election of a Pope.

Whenever he came to his native town, he would visit his mother's grave.

Cooray died at age 86. He is buried in the crypt of the Basilica of Our Lady of Lanka, whose completion he oversaw.

Cause of beatification
In the first step towards sainthood, Pope Benedict XVI declared him to be a Servant of God on 22 November 2010 after the Congregation for the Causes of Saints gave its approval to begin the canonization cause.

References

External links
Official Website of the Government of Sri Lanka
Cardinals of the Holy Roman Church
Catholic-Hierarchy 
Biography from the Times of Sri Lanka

1901 births
1988 deaths
Sri Lankan cardinals
20th-century Roman Catholic archbishops in Sri Lanka
Participants in the Second Vatican Council
Alumni of University of London Worldwide
Alumni of the University of London
Alumni of the Ceylon University College
Cardinals created by Pope Paul VI
Servants of God
20th-century venerated Christians
People from Negombo
Sinhalese priests
Sri Lankan Roman Catholic archbishops
Roman Catholic archbishops of Colombo
Missionary Oblates of Mary Immaculate